The 2021–22 season is Peterborough United's 88th year in their history and first season back in the Championship since the 2012–13 following promotion last season. Along with the league, the club will also compete in the FA Cup and the EFL Cup. The season covers the period from 1 July 2021 to 30 June 2022.

First-team squad

Statistics

|-
!colspan=15|Players out on loan:

|-
!colspan=15|Player who left the club:

|}

Goals record

Disciplinary record

Pre-season friendlies
As part of their pre-season preparations, Peterborough United announced friendly matches against Bedford Town, Stamford, Gillingham, Barnet, double header with Oxford United, Portsmouth, Swindon Town and King's Lynn Town.

Competitions

Championship

League table

Results summary

Results by matchday

Matches
Peterborough United's fixtures were announced on 24 June 2021.

FA Cup

Peterborough United were drawn at home to Bristol Rovers in the third round.

EFL Cup

Peterborough United were drawn at home to Plymouth Argyle in the first round.

Transfers

Transfers in

Loans in

Loans out

Transfers out

References

Peterborough United
Peterborough United F.C. seasons